Felipe Carrillo Puerto (8 November 1874 – 3 January 1924) was a Mexican journalist, politician and revolutionary who became known for his efforts at reconciliation between the Yucatec Maya and the Mexican government after the Caste War. He was governor of the Mexican state of Yucatán from 1922 to 1924.

Prerevolution and personal life
Carrillo Puerto was born in the town of Motul, Yucatán, 45 km northeast of Mérida, and was of partly indigenous Maya background; he was rumored to be a descendant of the Nachi Cocom dynasty of Mayapan. His parents were the merchant Justiniano Pasos Carrillo Puerto and his wife Adelaide Solis. He was one of fourteen children, thirteen of whom lived into adulthood.  Although his family were Spanish speakers, he also grew up speaking Maya (Mayathan), the language of the neighborhood children.

He was a socialist who favored land reform, women's suffrage, and rights for the indigenous Maya people. As a teenager during the Caste War, he was briefly imprisoned for urging the Maya people to tear down a fence that had been built by the large landowners around lands in the  community of Dzununcán to keep the Maya out. He obtained work on the local railways (known as tramways), joined the railway workers union, and married Isabel Palma.

Carrillo Puerto then began publishing and editing El Heraldo de Motul, which was briefly closed down in 1907 by the authorities for "insulting public officials". In the Yucatán gubernatorial election of 1909, Carrillo Puerto supported the candidacy of the poet Delio Moreno Cantón in the three-way race against the Antirreeleccionista Party's (Maderista's) José María Pino Suárez, and the pro-Díaz Enrique Muñoz Arístegui. Arístegui was announced as the winner in what is generally considered to have been a fraudulent tally. In 1910 he attended the Third Congress of the Associated Press of the States (Congreso de la Prensa Asociada de los Estados) in Mexico City and spearheaded a resolution to free the political prisoners being held at San Juan de Ulúa; a resolution that President Díaz acceded to. In 1912, he went to work as a reporter and columnist for the periodical Revista de Mérida run by his friend and colleague Carlos R. Menéndez.

In 1923, he had a romance with a United States journalist, Alma Reed of San Francisco, California, which was commemorated in the song commissioned by him: "Peregrina", written by the poet Luis Rosado de la Vega and the composer Ricardo Palmerín.

As governor
In February 1922 Felipe Carrillo Puerto took the oath of office and made his first speech as governor, and did so in the Maya language . He promised to respect and enforce the Federal Constitution, as well as the resolutions adopted by the Workers' Congress of Motul and Izamal. During his 20 months as governor, Carrillo Puerto initiated land reform, confiscating large estates and returning land to the native Maya.  He promoted new farming techniques, granted women political rights, began family planning programs, fought against alcoholism, and fought for the conservation and restoration of the pre-Columbian Maya archaeological sites. In the first year of his administration 417 public schools were opened.

As governor he founded the Universidad Nacional del Sureste, now called the Universidad Autónoma de Yucatán (UADY).

Carrillo Puerto was not a supporter of the Adolfo de la Huerta rebellion against President Álvaro Obregón, and General Plutarco Elías Calles.  As a result, he was captured by rebel army officers,  tried by a military tribunal, and executed by a firing squad on 3 January 1924, along with three of his brothers, Wilfrido, Benjamin, and Edesio, and eight of their friends.

Felipe Carrillo Puerto was called the "Red Dragon with the Eyes of Jade" ("El Dragón Rojo de los Ojos de Jade") by his enemies and the "Apostle of the Bronze Race" ("Apóstol de la raza de bronce") by those who loved him.

Legacy
The movie Peregrina regarding his life was made in 1974 starring Antonio Aguilar.

The towns of Felipe Carrillo Puerto, Quintana Roo (formerly Santa Cruz de Bravo), Felipe Carrillo Puerto, Michoacan and Felipe Carrillo Puerto, Oaxaca, were named in his honor.

References

Further reading
 
 
 
 
 

1872 births
1924 deaths
Assassinated Mexican politicians
Deaths by firearm in Mexico
Governors of Yucatán (state)
Mexican people of Maya descent
Mexican revolutionaries
Mexican socialists
Writers from Yucatán (state)
Politicians from Yucatán (state)
People of the Mexican Revolution
People murdered in Mexico